George Christy (May 14, 1927 – August 11, 2020) was an American columnist who wrote for The Hollywood Reporter for 26 years and later for The Beverly Hills Courier.

References

External links
Articles by George Christy in the Beverly Hills Courier

1927 births
2020 deaths
American columnists
Writers from Los Angeles